Pheromermis is a genus of nematodes belonging to the family Mermithidae.

The species of this genus are found in North America.

Species:

Pheromermis montanus 
Pheromermis myopis 
Pheromermis myrmecophila 
Pheromermis pachysoma 
Pheromermis robustus 
Pheromermis rubzovi 
Pheromermis tabani 
Pheromermis tabanivora 
Pheromermis vernalis 
Pheromermis vesparum 
Pheromermis villosa 
Pheromermis zaamini

References

Nematodes